Alexander Cussons may refer to:

 Alexander Tom Cussons (1875–1951), chairman of Cussons Sons & Co
 Alexander Stockton Cussons (1914–1986), chairman of Cussons Group